Rait Keerles (born 22 November 1980) is a retired Estonian professional basketball player. Keerles started his professional career in 1997, when he signed with BC Kalev. He has also played for Canon ENM and BC Tallinna Kalev before signing with BC Kalev/Cramo (previously known as Ehitustööriist). With the team he won four Estonian Cups and four Estonian Championship gold medals. From 2009–2011 Keerles was the captain of the team. In July 2011, Keerles signed with Gloria Giants Düsseldorf of the German 2. Bundesliga.
After the season Keerles decided to return to his former club BC Kalev/Cramo. For the 2013–14 season he signed with Rakvere Tarvas but left the team with mutual consent to play for CS Energia Rovinari in Romania. For the 2014–15 season he returned to Estonia to play his last professional season for TYCO Rapla. He has also been a member of the Estonia national basketball team in 2002–03 and 2008–09 seasons.

Honours
 1997–98 Estonian League (BC Kalev)
 2004–05 Estonian League (Ehitustööriist)
 2005–06 Estonian Cup (BC Kalev/Cramo)
 2005–06 Estonian League (BC Kalev/Cramo)
 2006–07 Estonian Cup (BC Kalev/Cramo)
 2007–08 Estonian Cup (BC Kalev/Cramo)
 2008–09 Estonian Cup (BC Kalev/Cramo)
 2008–09 Estonian League (BC Kalev/Cramo)
 2010–11 Estonian League (BC Kalev/Cramo)
 2012–13 Estonian League (BC Kalev/Cramo)
 2013–14 Romanian Cup (Energia Rovinari)

References

External links
 Profile at bckalev.ee
 Profile at basket.ee
 Profile at bbl.net

1980 births
Living people
BC Kalev/Cramo players
Estonian men's basketball players
Korvpalli Meistriliiga players
Power forwards (basketball)
Rapla KK players
BC Rakvere Tarvas players
Sportspeople from Paide